Frederick L. Guy (May 23, 1897 – December 22, 1971) was an American jazz banjo player and guitarist.

Born in Burkeville, Virginia, Guy was raised in New York City. He played guitar and banjo with Joseph C. Smith's Orchestra. In the early 1920s, Guy joined Duke Ellington's Washingtonians, switching from banjo to guitar in the early 1930s. He remained with Ellington's orchestra until 1949. He retired, moved to Chicago, and for twenty years ran a ballroom. In 1971, he committed suicide.

References

External links
 Fred Guy recordings at the Discography of American Historical Recordings.

1897 births
1971 deaths
1971 suicides
20th-century American male musicians
20th-century guitarists
American jazz guitarists
American male guitarists
American male jazz musicians
Duke Ellington Orchestra members
Jazz musicians from Virginia
People from Burkeville, Virginia
Suicides in Illinois